Census Division No. 10 (Whitehorse Plains) is a census division located within the Central Plains Region of the Province of Manitoba, Canada. Unlike in some other provinces, census divisions do not reflect the organization of local government in Manitoba. These areas exist solely for the purposes of statistical analysis and presentation; they have no government of their own.

The economic base of the region is agriculture, livestock and manufacturing. The population of the area in 2006 census was 9,902.

Demographics 

Municipalities

Cartier
Macdonald
St. François Xavier

References

External links
Manitoba Community Profiles: Whitehorse Plains

10